The Polaroid Palette and Polaroid ProPalette are a series of digital film recorders from Polaroid Corporation. The line started in the early 1980s, using 35mm film to produce slides for presentations. All versions of GEM provide drivers.

Models
 Polaroid Palette
 Polaroid Palette Plus
 Polaroid HR-6000
 Polaroid ProPalette 7000
 Polaroid ProPalette 8000
 Polaroid Palette ColorTune

See also
Olivetti M24

References

Polaroid Corporation
Film recorders